Coda is a 1994 novel by Australian author Thea Astley.

Plot summary
The novel is a satire on old age and concerns Kathleen Hackendorf who has reached the age when she must decide on where she is going to live until the end of her days. She begins to get lost when out of her house and discovers that the government requires her house as right-of-way for a road.  She calls on her children for help, but they have their own selfish lives to lead: Shamrock (Sham) is the wife of a crooked politician and overly self-obsessed, and Brian is miserably married.  Neither of them want anything to do with her and pack her off to Passing Downs retirement village. 

But Kathleen refuses to be "rendered invisible" as a result of her age and fights to maintain her dignity.

Reviews

 Publishers' Weekly: "...sparks of humor provide balance, humanizing a fictional landscape that otherwise promises little hope or compassion."
 Kirkus Review: "A spare, sharp-boned bird of a novel, whose song is wrenchingly sad yet full of indomitable spirit...Astley is a marvelous writer and a hilarious, merciless, and poignant truth-teller."

Notes
 This novel was selected as a New York Times Book Review Notable Book of 1994: "In a shopping mall in northern Australia, the spirited, eccentric heroine of Ms. Astley's 13th novel, a kind of female Lear, contemplates her past and articulates her wrath at age and abandonment."

References

1994 Australian novels
Novels by Thea Astley
Heinemann (publisher) books